The Nowra Bridge is a road bridge that carries the Princes Highway over the Shoalhaven River, at Nowra in the Shoalhaven Council local government area, on the South Coast of New South Wales, Australia. The bridge joins the main area of Nowra to North Nowra and Bomaderry.

Description 
The bridge was originally intended to carry a double railway track, as part of the proposed extension of the South Coast line to Jervis Bay and possibly . However, the railway was never extended past Bomaderry station where trains still terminate today, so the bridge was converted for road traffic, as the residents of Nowra wanted a road bridge that connected Bomaderry to Nowra.

The bridge was designed by American engineer Charles Shaler Smith and is considered to be of local historical significance. The bridge was completed in 1881 and is built from wrought iron with a steel approach span. The bridge had a timber deck for 100 years until in 1981 reinforced concrete was laid over steel Armco decking. The pairs of cast iron piers are original and were supplied locally by the Atlas Foundry, Sydney. It was the largest bridge project in New South Wales prior to the 1889 Hawkesbury River Railway Bridge.

The two-lane bridge currently carries southbound traffic only. A newer concrete three-lane bridge opened in 1981 carries northbound traffic on the Princes Highway.

Replacement bridge 
In August 2019 Infrastructure Australia approved the construction of a new four-lane bridge immediately to the west (upriver) of the existing bridges. This new bridge would become the new crossing for northbound traffic. The existing northbound bridge would be converted for southbound traffic, allowing the bridge built in 1881 to be re-purposed as a pedestrian and cycle bridge. The replacement bridge is expected to cost 342 million; with funding to be shared between the Commonwealth and New South Wales governments, and the private sector. Work commenced in early 2020 and is expected to be completed in 2024.

See also 

 List of bridges in Australia

References

External links
Nowra Bridge (Trove)
Bridge into Nowra over the Shoalhaven River NLA Digital Collections
Nowra - Second Bridge Construction by Sandown (Flickr)

Bridges completed in 1881
Steel bridges in Australia
Road bridges in New South Wales
Truss bridges in Australia
Shoalhaven River
1881 establishments in Australia
Nowra, New South Wales